East Franklin is an unincorporated community and census-designated place (CDP) located in Franklin Township, in Somerset County, New Jersey, United States. At the 2010 United States Census, East Franklin's population was 8,669.

Geography

Demographics

Census 2010

References

Census-designated places in Somerset County, New Jersey
Franklin Township, Somerset County, New Jersey